Parks is an unincorporated community in Scott County, Arkansas, United States. Parks has a ZIP code 72950.

History
Parks was originally called White Church, and under the latter name was laid out in 1838.  A post office called Parks has been in operation since 1838.  The present name is after Cyrus Parks, the first postmaster.

References

Unincorporated communities in Scott County, Arkansas
Unincorporated communities in Arkansas